Kyrpy (Qırpı) is a rural locality (a selo) in Tyuldinsky Selsoviet, Kaltasinsky District, Bashkortostan, Russia. The population was 15 as of 2010. There is 1 street.

Geography 
Kyrpy is located 17 km north of Kaltasy (the district's administrative centre) by road. Novokudashevo is the nearest rural locality.

References 

Rural localities in Kaltasinsky District